opened in Chūō-ku, Ōsaka, Japan in 2001. The project architects were César Pelli & Associates and Nihon Sekkei. It is adjoined by an atrium to the NHK Osaka Broadcasting Center, which was designed by the same architects and built at the same time. The former Osaka City Museum closed earlier the same year. Over four floors, the displays tell the history of the city from the time of the Former Naniwa Palace, located in the area now occupied by the museum. Remains of a warehouse, walls, and water supply facilities for the palace are also on view in the basement. In 2005, the collection numbered some 100,000 objects. By 2016, it had grown to 138,595 objects, while a further 17,632 items were on deposit at the museum.

See also
 Museums in Osaka

References

External links

 Osaka Museum of History (official site)
 Osaka Museum of History at The Skyscraper Center
 Project entry  at Pelli Clarke Pelli Architects (named César Pelli & Associates at the time they designed the building)
 Project entry at the Nihon Sekkei website

Museums in Osaka
History museums in Japan
Chūō-ku, Osaka
2001 establishments in Japan
Museums established in 2001